Sabino Ocan Odoki (born 8 August 1957), is a Roman Catholic prelate, who serves as the Bishop of the Roman Catholic Diocese of Arua, in Uganda. He was installed as Bishop of Arua Diocese on 18 December 2010.

Background and education
He was born at Layibi Village, Gulu District, in the Acholi sub-region, in the Northern Region of Uganda, on 8 August 1957.

He attended Holy Rosary Primary School, in Gulu. He was then admitted to Aboke Minior Seminary in Aboke, Kole District for two years. He continued with minor seminary at Lacor Minor Seminary, in Gulu, for another two years, completing there in 1975.

In 1976, he was admitted to Katigondo Major Seminary, in present-day Kalungu District, to study Philosophy, spending there three years. In 1980, he transferred to National Major Seminary Ggaba, in Ggaba, Kampala, where he studied Theology, for the next three years.

He was admitted to the Catholic University of Eastern Africa, in Nairobi, Kenya, where he graduated with a Licentiate of Sacred Theology and a Doctor of Sacred Theology in 1987 and 1992, respectively.

As priest
He was ordained priest on 10 September 1983 at Gulu Roman Catholic Cathedral, in Gulu. He served as priest of the Archdiocese of Gulu until 22 July 2006.

As bishop
He was appointed auxiliary bishop of the Roman Catholic Archdiocese of Gulu on 22 July 2006, by Pope Benedict XVI and ordained bishop on 21 October 2006 at Gulu, by John Baptist Odama, Archbishop of Gulu, assisted by Emmanuel Cardinal Wamala, Cardinal-Priest of Sant’Ugo and the Apostolic Nuncio in Uganda at the time, Archbishop Christophe Pierre.

He was appointed as the Apostolic Administrator of Arua Diocese, on 19 August 2009 by Pope Benedict XVI and confirmed as the Bishop of Arua Diocese. He was installed as Bishop of Arua Diocese on 18 December 2010, at Ediofe Cathedral, Arua.

See also
 Uganda Martyrs
 Roman Catholicism in Uganda

Succession table

References

External links

Row over bishop threatens to split diocese As of 18 September 2013.

1957 births
Living people
21st-century Roman Catholic bishops in Uganda
People from Gulu District
Roman Catholic bishops of Arua
Roman Catholic bishops of Gulu